Luiza Licina-Bode (born 10 October 1972) is a German politician of the Social Democratic Party (SPD) who has been serving as a member of the Bundestag since 2021.

Early life and education
Licina-Bode was born 1972 in the West German town of Bad Berleburg and studied law at the Ruhr University Bochum in order to become a lawyer.

Political career
Licina-Bode entered the SPD in 2005 and was elected to the Bundestag in the 2021 elections, representing the Siegen-Wittgenstein district.

In parliament, Licina-Bode has since been serving on the Committee on Legal Affairs and the Committee on Food and Agriculture.

Other activities
 University of Siegen, Member of the Board of Trustees (since 2022)
 German United Services Trade Union (ver.di), Member (since 2015)

References 

Living people
1972 births
Social Democratic Party of Germany politicians
Members of the Bundestag 2021–2025
21st-century German politicians
21st-century German women politicians
Female members of the Bundestag